Spała Landscape Park (Spalski Park Krajobrazowy) is a protected area (Landscape Park) in central Poland, established in 1995, covering an area of . It takes its name from the village of Spała.

The Park lies within Łódź Voivodeship: in Opoczno County (Gmina Opoczno, Gmina Poświętne, Gmina Sławno) and Tomaszów Mazowiecki County (Gmina Czerniewice, Gmina Inowłódz, Gmina Lubochnia, Gmina Rzeczyca, Gmina Tomaszów Mazowiecki).

Within the Landscape Park are five nature reserves.

There are three nature reserves on its territory: Konewka, Spała and Żądłowice. The next three reserves are located in the park's buffer zone: Jeleń, Sługocice and Gać Spalska.

References 

Landscape parks in Poland
Parks in Łódź Voivodeship
Tomaszów Mazowiecki County